Riečka is a village and municipality in Banská Bystrica District in the Banská Bystrica Region of central Slovakia.

History
In historical records the village was first mentioned in 1455.

Geography
The municipality lies at an altitude of 492 metres and covers an area of 6.822 km². It has a population of about 751 people.

References

External links
 Municipal website 

Villages and municipalities in Banská Bystrica District